Tomasz Tadeusz Stefaniszyn (16 March 1929 – 8 September 1986) was a Polish footballer who competed in the 1952 Summer Olympics and in the 1960 Summer Olympics.

References

1929 births
1986 deaths
Association football goalkeepers
Poland international footballers
Polish footballers
Olympic footballers of Poland
Footballers at the 1952 Summer Olympics
Footballers at the 1960 Summer Olympics
Legia Warsaw players
People from Stryi
People from Lwów Voivodeship
Gwardia Warsaw players